John Herbert Bond ( – after 1921) was a rugby union player who represented Australia.

Bond, a hooker, was born in Newcastle, New South Wales and claimed a total of 4 international rugby caps for Australia.

References

Australian rugby union players
Australia international rugby union players
1890s births
20th-century deaths
Year of birth uncertain
Year of death missing
Rugby union players from Newcastle, New South Wales
Rugby union hookers